Repinaella is an extinct genus from a well-known class of fossil marine arthropods, the trilobites. It lived during the late Atdabanian stage.

Distribution 
 Repinaella siberica has been found in the Lower Cambrian of Siberia (Pestrotsvet Formation, Lena River).
 cf. Repinaella sp., the first trilobite to appear in Laurentia, has been reported from the Lower Cambrian of Nevada (Northern Clayton Ridge; Andrew Mountain Member of the Montezuma Range, Campito Formation). The occurrence of cf. Repinaella is approximately correlative with the earliest trilobites in Siberia and western Gondwana.

Taxonomy 
Within the "Fallotaspidoidea" superfamily Repinaella siberia is closest to the common ancestor with the other Olenellina, particularly Pseudojudomia egregia, and the common characters of these two species were probably shared with the common ancestor of all trilobites.

References

Cambrian trilobites
Fallotaspidoidea
Cambrian trilobites of Asia
Cambrian trilobites of Europe
Cambrian trilobites of North America

Cambrian genus extinctions